Vikramaditya Singh may refer to:

 Vikramaditya Singh (Maharana) (1517–1534), Maharana of Mewar Kingdom from 1531–1534
 Vikramaditya Singh (politician) (born 1964), Indian businessman and politician
 Vikramaditya Singh (Himachal Pradesh politician) (born 1989), Indian politician